EHU may refer to:

 ʻEhu, ancient Hawaiian nobleman
 Edge Hill University
 Ehueun language
 European Humanities University
 University of the Basque Country
 Ezhou Huahu Airport